Robert Stannard (born 16 September 1998) is an Australian cyclist, who currently rides for UCI ProTeam .

In October 2020, he was named in the startlist for the 2020 Vuelta a España.

Major results 

2017
 1st Stage 3 Rhône-Alpes Isère Tour
 2nd Overall Toscana-Terra di Ciclismo
 6th Overall Paris–Arras Tour
 Oceania Under-23 Road Championships
7th Road race
7th Time trial
 8th Overall Giro Ciclistico d'Italia
2018
 1st Piccolo Giro di Lombardia
 1st Gran Premio di Poggiana
 1st Giro del Belvedere
 2nd Trofeo PIVA
 3rd Overall Giro Ciclistico d'Italia
1st Stage 9b (ITT)
 3rd Overall New Zealand Cycle Classic
1st  Young rider classification
 3rd Ronde van Vlaanderen Beloften
 4th Flèche Ardennaise
 4th Trofeo Città di San Vendemiano
 8th Japan Cup
 9th Gravel and Tar
 9th Overall Tour de Bretagne
1st Stage 7
2019
 1st Stage 1b (TTT) Settimana Internazionale di Coppi e Bartali
2020
 2nd Giro della Toscana
 3rd Giro dell'Appennino
 8th Gran Piemonte
2021
 6th Brabantse Pijl
2022
 1st  Overall Tour de Wallonie
1st  Points classification
1st  Young rider classification
 6th Coppa Bernocchi

Grand Tour general classification results timeline

References

External links

1998 births
Living people
Australian male cyclists
Cyclists from Sydney
20th-century Australian people
21st-century Australian people